Yeshurun Keshet (29 November 1893 – 22 February 1977), born Ya'akov Yehoshua Koplewitz, was an Israeli poet, essayist, translator and literary critic.

Biography
Keshet was born in Mińsk Mazowiecki, Congress Poland, and sent by his parents to Tel Aviv in 1911 to attend the Herzliya Hebrew Gymnasium. Between 1920 and 1926 he studied at universities in Rome and Berlin, and also taught in Marijampole, Lithuania. He Hebraized his surname following the establishment of the State of Israel in 1948.

Work
Keshet's volumes of poetry include Ha-Helekh ba-Aretz (1932), Elegyot (1944), and Ha-Ḥayyim ha-Genuzim (1959). Notable among his works of literary criticism is his monograph on Micha Josef Berdyczewski (1958).

Keshet translated into Hebrew numerous classics of philosophy and literature, among them works by Winston Churchill, Moses Hess, William James, Franz Kafka, Jack London, Thomas Mann, and Romain Rolland.

Awards
Tchernichovsky Prize for the translation of the essays of Michel de Montaigne (1948)
 from the Municipality of Holon (1968)
Bialik Prize (1976)

References

1893 births
1977 deaths
20th-century essayists
20th-century Israeli poets
Brenner Prize recipients
Burials at the Jewish cemetery on the Mount of Olives
Herzliya Hebrew Gymnasium alumni
Israeli essayists
Israeli literary critics
Israeli male poets
Congress Poland emigrants to the Ottoman Empire
Translators to Hebrew
Recipients of Prime Minister's Prize for Hebrew Literary Works
20th-century translators